Ovčie is a village and municipality in Prešov District in the Prešov Region of eastern Slovakia.

History
In historical records the village was first mentioned in 1320.

Geography
The municipality lies at an altitude of 488 metres and covers an area of 3.157 km². It has a population of about 680 people.

Villages and municipalities in Prešov District
Šariš